Urophora tengritavica is a species of tephritid or fruit flies in the genus Urophora of the family Tephritidae.

Distribution
Kyrgyzstan.

References

Urophora
Insects described in 1998
Diptera of Asia